The Venezuelan wood quail (Odontophorus columbianus) is a bird species in the family Odontophoridae, the New World quail. It is found in the Venezuelan Coastal Range.

Taxonomy and systematics

Some authors have suggested that the Venezuelan wood quail and gorgeted wood quail (Odontophorus strophium), Tacarcuna wood quail (O. dialeucos), black-fronted wood quail (O. atrifons), and black-breasted wood quail (O. lecuolaemus) are actually a single species, but this treatment has not been accepted by the major avian taxonomic systems. The species is monotypic.

Description

Males are estimated to weigh  and females . Adult males have a white throat and chin with black streaks. The rest of the plumage is reddish brown with large white marks on the breast, belly, and flanks. The female has paler brown underparts with less conspicuous white marks, and the juvenile is similar to the female.

Distribution and habitat

The Venezuelan wood quail is principally found in the central part of Venezuela's Coastal Range, from Carabobo east to northwestern Miranda. There are also two sight records from Táchira in the west near the Colombian border.

Behavior

Feeding

The Venezuelan wood quail forages by scratching litter and bare soil to feed on seeds, fruits, insects, worms, and roots.

Breeding

The Venezuelan wood quail's breeding season begins in March and is thought to extend to the end of July. One nest has been found; it was at the base of palms, had a roof of vegetation, and contained six eggs.

Vocalization

The Venezuelan wood quail's advertising call is "a rapidly repeated antiphonal duet" rendered as "churdole-chur-it, churdole-chur-it...".

Status

The IUCN has assessed the Venezuelan wood quail as Near Threatened "because it has a small extent of occurrence within which it is presumed to be declining owing to habitat loss and hunting pressure".

References

Venezuelan wood quail
Birds of the Venezuelan Coastal Range
Endemic birds of Venezuela
Venezuelan wood quail
Taxonomy articles created by Polbot